Drouin Secondary College is a large secondary school in Drouin, Victoria, located outside of Melbourne, Australia. It was established in 1956. Drouin's mottos are "Achievement, Respect, Commitment, Community" and "Finem Respice", which means "look to the end". There are 103 staff members at the school.

Staff

Notable former students
Peter Knights
Dale Thomas

References

Public high schools in Victoria (Australia)